The Christian Post is an American non-denominational, conservative, evangelical Christian online newspaper. Based in Washington, D.C., it was founded in March 2004.

News topics include the Church, ministries, missions, education, Christian media, health, opinions, U.S. events, and international events. Also featured are devotionals, cartoons, and videos. 

Its executive editor is Richard Land, president of Southern Evangelical Seminary, and president emeritus of the Southern Baptist Convention's Ethics & Religious Liberty Commission. Christopher Chou is CEO.

History
The online newspaper was founded in March 2004.  The objective is to deliver news, information, and commentaries relevant to Christians across denominational lines and to bring greater attention to activities of Christians and Christian groups in United States and around the world. It moved its headquarters from San Francisco, California to Washington, D.C. in 2006. In 2017, the website had a monthly average of 10 million visits.

On December 23, 2019, Napp Nazworth, a nearly ten-year veteran of the publication and an editor for The Christian Post, resigned because the magazine planned to publish an article supporting President Trump after he became the subject of an editorial by a peer publication, Christianity Today. In that article, Mark Galli called for the removal of the president on December 19, 2019, following the impeachment. Nazworth stated that he could not "be an editor for a publication with that editorial voice" and resigned from The Christian Post as its political editor.

Membership
The Christian Post is a Global Partner of the World Evangelical Alliance and a Member of the Evangelical Press Association.

References

External links 
 The Christian Post (official site)

Newspapers established in 2004
Internet properties established in 2004
Mass media companies based in Washington, D.C.
Christian mass media companies
Christian media
Christian websites
Evangelical newspapers